BMJ (Ben Mutua Jonathan) Muriithi (born Jonathan Nyaga; 4 May 1969) is a print, radio and television journalist and actor based in the United States.  Muriithi is also a regional reporter and correspondent for NTV, a Kenyan media outlet, QTV, and the Nation Newspaper, all owned by Nation Media Group (NMG). He previously worked for The Standard of Kenya as a US correspondent.

Biography
BMJ Muriithi was born in Kanyuambora village, Embu district in the Eastern province of Kenya. A son of Kenyan small-scale farmers, the late Sospeter Mungwana Kironji Mutua and Jane Igoki Mungwana Kironji, he rose from a relatively modest family background to head one of the most popular drama clubs in Kenya, the Mt. Kenya Theatrix, before moving to the United States.

Early life, school, and career
Muriithi and his now late brother, Stephen Njagi Kironji, started acting in their village church at a very young age. Muriithi later joined Kangaru School, Embu, Kenya, graduating in 1986. He then joined a private school in Thika, Kenya while living with his father, who worked at SA Joytown Special School for disabled children as a caretaker. Muriithi became the YMCA Drama Club Chairperson in 1988 and later that year he was elected to head the Youth Department at the Thika YMCA branch. In 1990, he trained as a registration assistant at Kenya Institute of Surveying and Mapping (KISM) in Ruaraka. Upon graduating, Muriithi was hired by the Kenyan government and posted in Eastern Province as a Registration Assistant. While working with the Lands Department at the Eastern Provincial Headquarters in Embu, he joined renowned actor Joseph Murungu in the newly formed Mt Kenya Theatrix Drama Group under the auspices of the Kenya Red Cross, Embu Branch. While on an exchange program tour co-sponsored by the Kenya Red Cross Society and the Norwegian Red Cross Society, he enrolled in a certificate course in acting and photojournalism at Haraldvangen Institute in Norway, graduating in 1992.

Artistic activity
Earlier in his career, he traversed the country with members of Mt. Kenya Theatrix, sensitizing people to the dangers of HIV/AIDS through community theater under the sponsorship of Plan International, a non-governmental humanitarian organization. In high school, he was named the entertainer of the year of the class of 1986.

Muriithi produced and presented the arts segment of John Obong'o Jr.'s Kenya Beat, a popular Kenyan radio program aired on Monday mornings. He covered artistic activities in Nairobi and upcountry, including the national schools and colleges drama festivals. He frequented the Professional Centre adjacent to the Kenya National Assembly where some of the most prolific Kenyan and foreign thespians staged their plays under the directorship of James Falkland, the Scots-born director of the Phoenix Players.

In the mid-90s, he was featured on Kenyan radio, television and stage, and was appointed the executive chairman of Mt. Kenya Theatrix Club in 1995. Some of the productions he featured in included Athol Fugard's Sizwe Bansi Is Dead, Joseph Murungu's So Sweet a Bite, Francis Imbuga's Betrayal in the City, and John Ruganda's The Burdens, as well as a number of William Shakespeare's published works. During his days in Nairobi, he featured in some high-profile TV commercials, including one by then Celtel (later Zain and now Airtel), one of Africa's leading telecommunication companies.

He was also a co-presenter of The World This week, a news roundup program produced by Kenya Broadcasting Corporation KBC. Besides his duties at KBC, Muriithi produced and presented Biashara Ndogondogo, a popular radio program aired on Saturdays by Nairobi-based Nation Radio, now QFM which is owned by Nation Media Group.

While working with the media houses, he simultaneously served as a registration assistant with Kenya's department of lands in both Embu and Nairobi. Before leaving Kenya, he sat on the provincial adjudication board for Kenya Schools and Colleges Drama Festival. He was also a high school drama coach, producing and directing plays for Emma Girls School in Embu and Uthiru High School in Nairobi, both of which made it to the provincial level in the 90s.

Time in the US
In 2002, BMJ Muriithi moved to Georgia, US, where he enrolled to study Mass Communication and International Relations at Atlanta Metropolitan College. He worked as a correspondent and an editor with a US-based Kenyan Newspaper, Kenya Empowerment Newspaper, owned by Wilson Kimani Wanguhu. He was also a syndicated correspondent with Kenya Broadcasting Corporation, the Standard newspaper, Kenya, and a reporter for Minneapolis-based Mshale Newspaper.

On 23 November 2008, his article, "An Africa to-do list for Obama", was published in the Atlanta Journal-Constitution, the main Newspaper in the state of Georgia, US. The same was later published by The Washington Post, the oldest DC newspaper with the largest circulation in the City.

Activism 
In the early 1990s, Muriithi teamed up with fellow thespians, including Packson Ngugi and a group of activists led by Kenyan politician and later Cabinet Minister James Orengo, to protest the government's intention to sell the Kenya National Theatre building to the adjacent Norfolk Hotel against the wishes of the artists. The idea was consequently shelved.

In October 2009, Muriithi received an award from Kenya's ambassador to the US for what the Kenyan Embassy in Washington DC termed "his professional support and cooperation with the Embassy". It was presented at the Georgia World Congress Center in Atlanta, Georgia by HE. Peter Ogego, Ambassador Extraordinary and Plenipotentiary.

Controversy 
In the early 1990s, Muriithi declined a job offer as a newscaster on the government-run Kenya Broadcasting Corporation on principle. In a newspaper interview carried by The Standard, a leading Kenyan daily, on 5 September 1995, the journalist said he could not take up the job as a news anchor owing to his opposition to the way the media house was carrying out its business. "It is a mouthpiece for President Daniel Arap Moi and his cronies and much as I would love to serve my country in that respect, my conscience does not allow me", he told The Standard Newspaper. In opinion pieces carried by the local dailies in the mid-1990s, he attacked President Moi's administration, terming the second president of Kenya as "one of the worst strongmen the world has seen in recent times". Observers have often wondered whether the journalist has any particular political leaning since he is equally critical of the current Kenyan president, Mwai Kibaki. In a radio interview with ksnmedia.com, he quipped; "Kibaki's legacy is indelibly tainted by his association with the Moi administration. How does he explain his total silence as Moi's administration acted with impunity while he (Kibaki) comfortably sat in the same government, holding powerful positions, including that of the Vice-President of the republic of Kenya?"

In another interview with ksnmedia.com on 26 September 2010, Muriithi criticized Kibaki for what he termed "open nepotism", saying almost all the key positions in his wing of the coalition were held by his tribesmen, save for a few held by his close cousins, the Ameru. He was equally critical of Prime Minister Raila Amolo Odinga. "Why is his sister the Consul General in Los Angeles yet she is a PHD in Chemistry? Don't you think he should try to at least conceal the open nepotism?" he was quoted by Kenya Satellite News Network as wondering.

Asked what he thought of the founding president of Kenya as the country marked its 48th birthday, Muriithi said that Kenyatta had his successes as a statesman, but his administration generally laid the foundation for the official corruption which is so rampant in Kenya today. He said There seems to be consensus that Kenyatta perfected tribalism and amassed great wealth (including vast tracts of land) while ignoring the real heroes, the freedom fighters some of whom - like Dedan Kimathi - lost their lives, property and dignity as they fought for independence.

Personal
Muriithi is married to Edith Muriithi, a medical assistant and a student at Georgia State University. His daughter, Carole Wawira Muriithi attended School in Kenya, Cameroon, Ghana and Vietnam and was later a student at the University of Sussex, in the south of England. She now works in London with 'The Girl Network.' Carole's mother, Fiona Clare, works for CARE International.

References

https://www.nation.co.ke/authors/1959272-1962634-muyaa7z/index.html] Articles by BMJ Muriithi in Daily Nation
http://www.ajc.com/health/content/opinion/stories/2008/11/23/muriithied_1123.html?cxntlid=inform_sr
http://www.eastandard.net/news/InsidePage.php?id=1144026479&cid=159&
http://www.standardmedia.co.ke/InsidePage.php?id=2000003929&cid=4

External links
http://www.standardmedia.co.ke/InsidePage.php?id=2000001309&cid=159&story=Kenyan%20student%20dies%20in%20a%20US%20plane%20crash
http://www.standardmedia.co.ke/InsidePage.php?id=2000002337&cid=159&story
http://www.undpi.org/World-News/UN-accords-Nairobi-higher-status.html

See also
http://www.ksnmedia.com

Kenyan male television actors
Expatriate male actors in the United States
Kenyan expatriates in the United States
Kenyan journalists
Kenyan television journalists
Kenyan radio journalists
1969 births
Kenyan writers
Kenyan male writers
Living people
20th-century Kenyan male actors